Stansfeld Oxford & Bermondsey Club Football Club is a football club based in Chislehurst, Greater London, England. The club operates further teams, Stansfeld O&B and Stansfeld O&B Reserves, both playing in the Kent County League.

History
The club was established by John Stansfeld in 1897. In 1958 they joined Division Two of the Western Section of the Kent County League and went on to win the division at the first attempt, as well as the Division Two Challenge Cup. The club were promoted into the Premier Division, skipping Division One. They were Premier Division runners-up and won the Premier Division Cup in 1961–62. They went on to win back-to-back Premier Division titles in 1962–63 and 1963–64 before being promoted to the Senior Division, in which they were runners-up in 1964–65.

Stansfeld finished as Senior Division runners-up again in 1969–70, but were later relegated to the Premier Division, which they won for a third time in 1977–78. They were Senior Division runners-up in 1980–81 before winning the division in 1984–85. They were league champions again in 1986–87 and then won back-to-back titles in 1988–89 and 1989–90, before finishing as runners-up in 1990–91. When the league was reorganised in 1992 the club were placed in the Premier Division.

Stansfeld were Premier Division champions in 1994–95 and runners-up in 2002–03. Despite finishing fourth in 2006–07 the club were relegated to Division One West. However, they were runners-up in the division in 2007–08, earning an immediate promotion back to the Premier Division. The club won the Premier Division for a second time in 2009–10 and subsequently finished as runners-up in 2011–12 and 2014–15. In July 2016 Stansfeld took over Southern Counties East League Division One club Eltham Palace. The team continued playing under the Eltham Palace name until the end of the 2016–17 season, when they adopted the present name of Stansfeld.

The 2021–22 season saw Stansfeld win the Division One title.

Honours
Southern Counties East Football League
Division One champions 2021–22
Kent County League
Premier Division champions 1994–95, 2009–10
Western Section Senior Division champions 1984–85, 1986–87, 1988–89, 1989–90
Western Section Premier Division champions 1962–63, 1963–64, 1977–78
Western Section Division Two champions 1958–59
Inter Regional Challenge Cup winners 1989–90, 1991–92, 2001–02, 2002–03, 2014–15
Champions Trophy winners 2002–03
Senior Section Cup winners 1969–70
Senior Challenge Cup winners 1984–85, 1985–86, 1986–87
West Kent Challenge Shield winners 1985–86, 1989–90
Western Section Premier Division Cup winners 1961–62
Western Section Division Two Challenge Cup winners 1958–59

Records
Best FA Cup performance: Preliminary round, 2020–21
Best FA Vase performance: Fifth round, 2021–22

References

External links

Football clubs in England
Football clubs in London
Football clubs in Kent
Association football clubs established in 1897
1897 establishments in England
Kent County League
Southern Counties East Football League
Sport in the London Borough of Bromley